Fundraising plays a central role in many presidential campaigns, and is a key factor (others include endorsements/messaging/visits/staffers) in determining the viability of candidates.  Money raised is applied for the salaries of non-volunteers in the campaign, transportation, campaign materials, media advertisements and other contingencies.  Under United States law, officially declared candidates are required to file campaign finance details with the Federal Elections Commission (FEC) at the end of every calendar month or quarter.  Summaries of these reports are made available to the public shortly thereafter, revealing the relative financial situations of all the campaigns.

Post-General Filings 
Selected campaign-specific finance information from October 15, 2020 through November 23, 2020, according to the FEC.

Pre-General Filings 
Selected campaign-specific finance information from October 1, 2020 through October 14, 2020, according to the FEC.

September 2020 
Selected campaign-specific finance information through September 30, 2020, according to the FEC.

August 2020 
Selected campaign-specific finance information through August 31, 2020, according to the FEC.

July 2020 
Selected campaign-specific finance information through July 31, 2020, according to the FEC.

June 2020 
Selected campaign-specific finance information through June 30, 2020, according to the FEC.

May 2020 
Selected campaign-specific finance information through May 31, 2020, according to the FEC.

April 2020 
Selected campaign-specific finance information through April 30, 2020, according to the FEC.

 Democrats April 2020

 Republicans April 2020

March 2020 
Selected campaign-specific finance information through March 31, 2020, according to the FEC.

 Democrats March 2020

 Republicans March 2020

February 2020 
Selected campaign-specific finance information through February 29, 2020, according to the FEC.

 Democrats February 2020

 Republicans February 2020

January 2020 
Selected campaign-specific finance information through January 31, 2020, according to the FEC.

 Democrats January 2020

 Republicans January 2020

4th Quarter 2019 
Selected campaign-specific finance information through December 31, 2019, according to the FEC.

 Democrats 2019q4

 Republicans 2019q4

3rd Quarter 2019 
Selected campaign-specific finance information through September 30, 2019, according to the FEC.

 Democrats 2019q3

 Republicans 2019q3

2nd Quarter 2019 
Campaign-specific finance information through June 30, 2019, according to the FEC as of the quarterly filing deadline.

 Democrats 2019q2

 Republicans 2019q2

1st Quarter 2019 
Campaign-specific finance information through March 30, 2019, according to the FEC as of the quarterly filing deadline.

 Democrats 2019q1

 Republicans 2019q1

See also 
 Invisible/Money primary
2020 Democratic Party presidential primaries
Campaign finance in the United States

Notes

References

External links 

 Federal Election Commission official website
 FEC quarterly and semi-annual reports
 How Democrats learned to stop worrying and love Citizens United
 What You (Really) Need to Know About 501(c)(4)s
 Nine things you need to know about super PACs

Fundraising
Campaign finance in the United States